Charles S. Maier (born February 23, 1939, in New York City) is the Leverett Saltonstall Research Professor of History at Harvard University. He teaches European and international history at Harvard.

Biography
Maier served as the director of the Center for European Studies at Harvard, 1994-2001, and currently co-directs (with Sven Beckert, Sugata Bose, and Jean Comaroff) the Weatherhead Initiative in Global History.  He taught at Duke University 1976-81 and has also held various visiting professorships in Europe. He was married from 1961 to 2013 to the late Pauline Maier, Professor at MIT and noted American historian. In 2017 he married Marjorie Anne Sa'adah, professor emerita of government 
at Dartmouth College. He has three children and eight  grandchildren.

Awards and honors
He is a member of the Council on Foreign Relations and the American Academy of Arts and Sciences, and is a recipient of a John Simon Guggenheim Memorial Fellowship, an Alexander von Humboldt research prize fellowship, the Cross of Honor of the German Federal Republic, and the Cross of Honor for Science and Art, first class, of the Republic of Austria. The University of Padua awarded him a laurea honoris causa in European Studies in January 2018.

1976 George Louis Beer Prize, American Historical Society, Recasting Bourgeois Europe: Stabilization in France, Germany, and Italy in the Decade after World War I
1977 Herbert Baxter Adams Prize, American Historical Society, Recasting Bourgeois Europe: Stabilization in France, Germany, and Italy in the Decade after World War I

Partial bibliography

Books
 The Origins of the Cold War and contemporary Europe (New York, 1978)
  Reprinted with new prefaces, 1988 and 2015.
 In Search of Stability: Explorations in Historical Political Economy (New York: Cambridge University Press, 1987) online
 The Unmasterable Past: History, Holocaust, and German National Identity (Cambridge, MA: Harvard University Press, 1988)
 Dissolution: The Crisis of Communism and the End of East Germany (Princeton: Princeton University Press, 1997) online
 Among Empires: American Ascendancy and its Predecessors (Cambridge, MA: Harvard University Press, 2006)  online
 Leviathan 2.0: Inventing Modern Statehood (Cambridge, MA: Harvard University Press, 2014; also in Worlds Connected, Emily Rosenberg, ed. Harvard University Press, 2012)
 Once within Borders: Territories of Power, Wealth, and Belonging since 1500 (Cambridge, MA: Harvard University Press, 2016)

Articles

 "Between Taylorism and technocracy: European ideologies and the vision of industrial productivity in the 1920s." Journal of contemporary history 5#2 (1970): 27-61. online
 "The politics of productivity: foundations of American international economic policy after World War II." International Organization 31#4 (1977): 607-633. online
 "Marking time: the historiography of international relations." in The Past Before Us: Contemporary Historical Writing in the United States (1980): 355-87.
 "The two postwar eras and the conditions for stability in twentieth-century Western Europe." American Historical Review (1981): 327-352. online
“Consigning the Twentieth Century to History: Alternative Narratives for the Modern Era,” Forum Essay, American Historical Review, 105#3 (June 2000): 807-831. online
“The Cold War and the World Economy,” in The Cambridge History of the Cold War,  Melvyn P. Leffler and Odd Arne Westad, eds. (3 vols., Cambridge: Cambridge University Press, 2010 ), I, 44-66.

 “In Merkel’s Crisis, Echoes of Weimar,” NYR Daily: New York Review of Books, 12/4/2017.
 "H-Diplo Memories" (H-Diplo "Essay Series on Learning the Scholar’s Craft: Reflections of Historians and International Relations Scholars" 16 October 2020) online autobiography

References

External links 

 Harvard bio page
 Europe Needs a German Marshall Plan NYT Online, 11 June 2012
 short bio
 short bio

1939 births
Living people
21st-century American historians
21st-century American male writers
Educators from New York City
Harvard University alumni
Harvard University faculty
Historians from New York (state)
Historians of American foreign relations
Scarsdale High School alumni
American male non-fiction writers